The Versace Murder is a 1998 film written and directed by Menahem Golan and starring Franco Nero and Steven Bauer.

Premise
Spree killer Andrew Cunanan (Shane Perdue) leaves a trail of murder victims as he travels from San Francisco to Miami, finally killing world-famous fashion designer Gianni Versace (Franco Nero).  The film recounts Cunanan's life before and after the murder, including details on his four other victims and his efforts to evade a nationwide manhunt that would end in his suicide.

Principal cast
 Franco Nero as Gianni Versace
 Steven Bauer as FBI Agent John Jacoby 
 Shane Perdue as Andrew Cunanan
 Matt Servitto as David Madson
 Oscar Torre as Antonio D'Amico
 Mario Ortiz as Fernando Carreira
 David Anthony Pizzuto as Chief William Roberts 
 Dania Deville as Donatella Versace
 Renny Roker as Barnie Rogers

Home media
The film was released on DVD in Region 1 in 2005.

References

External links 

1998 films
1990s biographical films
American biographical films
LGBT-related films based on actual events
Films directed by Menahem Golan
Films scored by Claudio Simonetti
Films set in Miami
Films shot in Miami
Crime films based on actual events
American LGBT-related films
1998 crime films
1998 LGBT-related films
Films set in 1997
Versace
Films with screenplays by Menahem Golan
Films about murder
1990s American films